The Phan River is a river of Bình Thuận Province, Vietnam. It flows for 55 kilometres.

References

Rivers of Bình Thuận province
Rivers of Vietnam